NA-67 Sialkot-II is a constituency for the National Assembly of Pakistan.

Members of Parliament

2018-2022: NA-73 Sialkot-II

Election 2002 

General elections were held on 10 October 2002. Khawaja Muhammad Asif of PML-N won by 42,743 votes.

Election 2008 

General elections were held on 18 February 2008. Khawaja Muhammad Asif of PML-N won by 73,007 votes.

Election 2013 

General elections were held on 11 May 2013. Khawaja Muhammad Asif of PML-N won by 92,848 votes and became the member of National Assembly. On 26 April 2018, he was disqualified from holding a public office for life by the Islamabad High Court over possession of the UAE work permit but on his appeal Supreme Court of Pakistan qualified him for next elections in 2018.

Election 2018 
General elections were held on 25 July 2018.

See also
NA-66 Sialkot-I
NA-68 Sialkot-III

References

External links 
Election result's official website
Delimitation 2018 official website Election Commission of Pakistan

73
73